This is a list of notable people who were born or have lived in Krasnoyarsk, Russia.

Born in Krasnoyarsk

19th century

1801–1900 
 Vasily Surikov (1848–1916), Russian painter
 Vladimir Rebikov (1866–1920), Russian composer and pianist
 Pyotr Krasikov (1870–1939), functionary of the All-Union Communist Party (bolsheviks) and the Soviet Union; the first Procurator General of the Soviet Union, serving from 1924 to 1933
 Abram Markson (1888–1938), Russian and Soviet violinist and conductor

20th century

1901–1930 
 Vitaly Abalakov (1906–1986), Soviet mountaineer and inventor
 Yevgeniy Abalakov (1907–1948), Soviet alpinist and sculptor
 Tatiana Kopnina (1921–2009), Soviet Russian painter and art teacher
 Bob Martin (1922–1998), Austrian singer
Elena Abramovna Davidovich (1922 - 2013), Russian numismatist
 Viktor Astafyev (1924–2001), Soviet and Russian writer
 Yuz Aleshkovsky (born 1929), Russian writer, poet, playwright and performer of his own songs

1931–1950 
 Eduard Shafransky (1937–2005), Russian classical guitarist and composer
 Eduard Malofeyev (born 1942), Soviet and Belarusian football coach and player
 Vladimir Krainev (1944–2011), Russian pianist and professor of piano
 Yevgeni Popov (born 1946), Russian writer
 Valery Shmukler (born 1946), Soviet Ukrainian engineer
 Viktor Tretiakov (born 1946), Russian violinist and conductor
 Vladimir Kvint (born 1949), Russian-American economist and strategist
 Yevgeniy Yevsyukov (born 1950), Russian race walker

1951–1960 
 Jurgis Kairys (born 1952), Lithuanian aerobatic pilot and aeronautical engineer
 Oleg Romantsev (born 1954), Soviet and Russian international footballer and coach
 Sergey Lomanov, Sr. (born 1957), Russian bandy manager and former player (forward)
 Andreï Makine (born 1957), Russian-born French author
 Galina Yenyukhina (born 1959), Russian cyclist
 Edkham Akbulatov (born 1960), Russian politician

1961–1970 
 Dmitri Hvorostovsky (1962-2017), Russian operatic baritone
 Zosima Davydov (1963–2010), Russian Orthodox bishop of Yakutsk and Lensk
 Alexej Jaškin (born 1965), Russian-born Czech professional ice hockey defenceman
 Sergei Kruglov (born 1966), Russian poet and priest
 Oleg Kuzhlev (born 1966), Russian professional football coach and a former player
 Vyacheslav Atavin (born 1967), Soviet and Russian handball player
 Svetlana Fedotkina (born 1967), Russian speed skater
 Sergei Klischin (born 1967), Austrian judoka
 Orit Zuaretz (born 1967), Israeli politician
 Vladimir Baksheyev (born 1970), Russian professional footballer
 Andrey Vorobyov (born 1970), Russian politician, governor of Moscow Oblast since 2013
 Victor Remsha (born 1970), Russian businessman
 Mikhail Terentiev (born 1970), Russian Paralympian

1971–1980 
 Svetlana Tchernousova (born 1972), Russian former biathlete
 Igor Bakhtin (born 1973), Russian professional football coach and a former player
 Larissa Loukianenko (born 1973), Belarusian individual rhythmic gymnast
 Maxim Galanov (born 1974), Russian professional ice hockey player
 Yevgeni Popov (born 1976), Russian bobsledder
 Konstantin Aladashvili (born 1977), Russian bobsledder and skeleton racer
 Andrei Drygin (born 1977), Tajik alpine skier of Russian ethnicity
 Yekaterina Mironova (born 1977), Russian skeleton racer
 Yuliya Pechonkina (born 1978), Russian athlete
 Olga Rocheva (born 1978), Russian cross country skier
 Natalya Safronova (born 1979), Russian female volleyball player
 Alyona Sidko (born 1979), Russian cross-country skier
 Elena Khrustaleva (born 1980), Russian, Belarusian and Kazakh biathlete
 Sergey Lomanov, Jr. (born 1980), Russian bandy player (forward)
 Pavel Shestakov (born 1980), Russian former alpine skier

1981–1985 
 Dmitry Abramovitch (born 1982), Russian bobsledder
 Anastasia Tambovtseva (born 1982), Russian luger
 Jury Veselov (born 1982), Russian luger
 Aleksandr Kharitonov (born 1983), Russian footballer
 Maksim Semakin (born 1983), Russian professional football player
 Viktoria Tereshkina (born 1983), Russian ballet dancer
 Andrey Yurkov (born 1983), Russian bobsledder
 Anna Astapenko (born 1984), Russian football defender
 Helene Fischer (born 1984), German singer and entertainer
 Evgeny Isakov (born 1984), Russian professional ice hockey forward
 Mikhail Komkov (born 1984), Russian professional footballer
 Alexander Semin (born 1984), Russian professional ice hockey winger
 Elena Suslova (born 1984), Russian football defender
 Yuliya Tarasenko (born 1984), Russian ski orienteering competitor
 Mikhail Kuzmich (born 1985), Russian luger
 Dmitry Rigin (born 1985), Russian foil fencer
 Aleksandr Tretyakov (born 1985), Russian skeleton racer
 Sergei Chepchugov (born 1985), Russian professional footballer
 Evgeny Ustyugov (born 1985), Russian biathlete

1986–1990 
 Polina Malchikova (born 1986), Russian ski-orienteering competitor
 Iya Gavrilova (born 1987), Russian ice hockey player
 Natalia Myasoyedova (born 1987), Russian basketball center
 Timofey Lapshin (born 1988), Russian biathlete
 Olga Korobkina (born 1989), Russian skeleton racer
 Yevgeni Pesegov (born 1989), Russian professional footballer
 Olga Potylitsina (born 1989), Russian skeleton racer
 Igor Polyanski (born 1990), Russian professional triathlete

1991–2000 
 Vladislav Antonov (born 1991), Russian luger
 Alexander Denisyev (born 1991), Russian luger
 Ksenia Krasilnikova (born 1991), Russian pair skater
 Nikolay Olyunin (born 1991), Russian snowboarder
 Ekaterina Baturina (born 1992), Russian luger
 Nikolay Martsenko (born 1993), Russian racing car driver
 Elizaveta Axenova (born 1995), Russian-born Kazakhstani luger
 Nikita Tregubov (born 1995), Russian skeleton racer
 Anton Mitryushkin (born 1996), Russian professional football player
 Alexey Bugaev (born 1997), Russian para-alpine skier

Lived in Krasnoyarsk 
 Nikolai Rezanov (1764–1807), Russian nobleman and statesman who promoted the project of Russian colonization of Alaska and California; died in Krasnoyarsk
 Christian Friedrich Lessing (1809–1862), German botanist; died in Krasnoyarsk
 Luka (Voyno-Yasenetsky) (1877–1961), bishop of Russian Orthodox Church and an archbishop of Simferopol and of the Crimea
 Pyotr Slovtsov (1886–1934), Russian tenor
 Vladimir Dolgikh (born 1924), Russian politician
 Innokenty Smoktunovsky (1925–1994), Soviet actor
 Valentin Danilov (born 1948), Russian physicist
 Vladimir Shalaev (born 1957), American physicist of Russian descent
Aleksandr Bushkov (born 1956), a best-selling Russian author
 Vyacheslav Butusov (born 1961), Russian singer and songwriter

See also 

 List of Russian people
 List of Russian-language poets

References 

Krasnoyarsk
Krasnoyarsk
List